Men's singles at the 2006 Asian Games was won by Danai Udomchoke of Thailand.

Schedule
All times are Arabia Standard Time (UTC+03:00)

Results

Finals

Top half

Section 1

Section 2

Bottom half

Section 3

Section 4

References
Men's singles draw

Tennis at the 2006 Asian Games